The Philamlife Tower is an office skyscraper located in Makati, Philippines. It is owned and developed by Philam Properties Corporation, the real estate arm of the Philippine American Life and General Insurance Company (Philamlife, now AIA Philippines).  Standing at 200 metres (656 feet), it is currently the 7th-tallest building in Makati, and is the 14th-tallest building in the country and Metro Manila as well. The building has 48 floors above ground, and 5 basement levels for parking. It is also the current headquarters of AIA Philippines since 2023, which will be renamed to AIA Tower.

Location

The building is located inside the Makati Central Business District along Paseo de Roxas in Makati, just a few meters away from its intersection with Ayala Avenue. The building is directly across the Ayala Triangle. It is a walk away from most of Makati's other major office buildings including the current tallest office building in the country, the PBCom Tower, and entertainment centers like Glorietta, Greenbelt and Ayala Center.

Design

The Philamlife Tower was designed by international architectural firm Skidmore, Owings & Merrill, LLPin association with local architecture firm W.V. Coscolluela & Associates as Architect of Record. Project and construction management works was provided by American firm Turner International and local company Jose Aliling & Associates, while construction of the building was made by the general contractor company EEI Corporation.

The 48-storey office building has large column-free floor plates, and uses fully unitized curtain wall of glass, aluminium panel and granite. The tower proper is incorporated into the system horizontal sunscreens, vertical fins, light bullnoses, crown lighting and balcony trellises. Shallow and deep-set cladding was used extensively on the building envelope. The entrance facades employed mirror stainless steel shopfronts, capped with functional sculpted canopies in hairline finish.

Amenities

Among its many features include: 100% raised flooring, which provides space beneath the floor for cabling and wiring, advanced structured cabling systems, automatic parking sensor system, double paned curtain wall, fully integrated building management and proximity card access system, provision for 24-hour air conditioning, 16 high speed elevators, and a helipad. It also has eight corner offices per floor to a private club facility, as well as, a cafeteria for tenants.

The Philamlife building incorporates 60,000 m2 of prime leasable office space, a private club facility, two major banking halls and required support services.

It also has The Tower Club, a private business club for corporate executives at the 33rd and 34th floor. The Club has an executive boardroom, six function or private dining rooms, two restaurants and a bar. The Club also houses a fitness center.

See also 
 List of tallest buildings in the Philippines

References

External links 
Philamlife Tower at Emporis
Philamlife Tower at Skyscraperpage.com
Philamlife Tower at Builder Federal

Skyscrapers in Makati
Skyscraper office buildings in Metro Manila
Skidmore, Owings & Merrill buildings
Office buildings completed in 2000